The following is a list of pipeline accidents in the United States in 1971. It is one of several lists of U.S. pipeline accidents. See also: list of natural gas and oil production accidents in the United States.

Incidents 

This is not a complete list of all pipeline accidents. For natural gas alone, the Pipeline and Hazardous Materials Safety Administration (PHMSA), a United States Department of Transportation agency, has collected data on more than 3,200 accidents deemed serious or significant since 1987.

A "significant incident" results in any of the following consequences:
 Fatality or injury requiring in-patient hospitalization.
 $50,000 or more in total costs, measured in 1984 dollars.
 Liquid releases of five or more barrels (42 US gal/barrel).
 Releases resulting in an unintentional fire or explosion.

PHMSA and the National Transportation Safety Board (NTSB) post-incident data and results of investigations into accidents involving pipelines that carry a variety of products, including natural gas, oil, diesel fuel, gasoline, kerosene, jet fuel, carbon dioxide, and other substances. Occasionally pipelines are re-purposed to carry different products.

The following incidents occurred during 1971:
 1971 A faulty valve on a 3-inch natural gas pipeline was suspected of causing a gas leak that resulted in three separate explosions, including a house explosion in Lambertville, New Jersey that killed seven people.
 1971 On April 17, a road grader hit a gas transmission pipeline in Mississippi, resulting in fatal burns to the grader operator. Later, it was found the pipeline only had 5 to 6 inches of soil cover in the area.
 1971 On June 5, an ammonia pipeline failed near Floral, Arkansas, releasing 80 tons of ammonia. A 6-year-old boy had to be hospitalized, cattle were killed or blinded, and 10,000 acres of trees had leaf scorching from the ammonia. Delays were made in notifying Arkansas State Department of Pollution Control and Ecology.
 1971 Two gas explosions occurred in North Richland Hills, Texas, on October 4. Gas migrated into two homes from leaking gas pipes.
 1971 A gas company repair crew was overcome in a service vault on November 17, in Pittsburgh, Pennsylvania. Two workmen were overcome initially, and four others attempting to rescue them were also overcome by gas asphyxiation. All six died.

References

Lists of pipeline accidents in the United States
pipeline accidents
1971 in the environment
1971 in the United States